Hatirpool is a busy marketplace in Dhaka, Bangladesh. It is a crowded area, with shopping complexes, hotel & restaurants, and market. The name 'Hatirpool' evolved from the British name of 'Hartlepool'.

Etymology
Hatirpool has an ancient history. The Bhawal Raja used to keep his tame elephants at Pilkhana. The elephants were taken to the wetlands through the Elephant Road and Hatirpool. There was a pool for transportation for Elephant. That's how the name Hatirpool came from.

Today
The pool has now gone, a long road in Hatirpool connects Katabon to Kawran Bazar.
Katabon 
Katabon (Bengali: কাটাবন)  in Shahbag, Dhaka is a center for katabon hare have Bangladesh first pet market and Nazu Motor Works Car Garage or Lot of Shop beside on road Printing Press

List of organization

Shopping complexes
 Eastern Plaza
 Nahar Plaza
 Motaleb Plaza

Hotel and restaurants
 Shawarma Kebasish House
 China Kitchen
 Shumi's Hotcake
 365 Kitchen
 Cafe 5 Elephant
 Pizza House
 Big Bite
 KFC
 Golden Chimney
 Manin Chinese
 Well Food
 Boss Sweets
 Fulkoli
 Baklava
 Decent Pastry Shop
 CP Five Star
 Haji Biriyani
 Seven Hill Restaurant

References

     4.  Restauants in Hatirpool

Neighbourhoods in Dhaka